Horst Hardy Bulau (born 14 August 1962) is a Canadian former ski jumper who competed for the Canadian national team.

Career
By the end of his career, he had thirteen World Cup wins to his credit, the most by any skier in Canadian history during that time period.  He placed in the top three positions in twenty-nine World Cup events, as well as numerous top ten finishes.  Bulau earned his thirteen World Cup victories at various hill sizes from 1981 to 1983 when he finished 3rd (1981), 3rd (1982), and 2nd (1983) in the overall World Cup standings.  His junior world championship in 1979 was the first Nordic title by a Canadian.

Bulau is a 4-time Olympian, as he participated in the 1980 (Lake Placid, USA), 1984 (Sarajevo, Yugoslavia), 1988 (Calgary, Alberta, Canada) and 1992 (Albertville, France) Winter Olympics.  At the 1988 Winter Olympics in Calgary, he placed seventh in the individual large hill event, the best ever performance for a Canadian ski jumper.

Bulau was inducted into the Canadian Olympic Hall of Fame in 1993, inducted into the Canadian Ski Hall of Fame in 1994 and inducted into the Ottawa Sports Hall of Fame in 1998.  On October 22, 2014, Horst Bulau was inducted into Canada's Sports Hall of Fame, witnessed by his wife, Kerry, and three children, Kiefer, Zofia and Rainer.

He was raised in Blossom Park in suburban south Ottawa, where his father, Otto (1926-2005), arrived in Canada as a refugee from East Prussia, and settled with his wife Helene (1928-1995) after the war.  The Bulaus had four children of whom Horst - the third - was the only son.

In 1978/79 and 1982/83, he was a recipient of the John Semmelink Memorial Award (awarded by the Canadian Amateur Ski Association to the skier who, through sportsmanship, conduct and ability, best represents Canada in international competition).  The Sports Federation of Canada named him Athlete of the Month in March 1981, January 1982 and March 1983.  At the Tribute of Champions event he was the recipient of an Excellence Award in 1982, 1983 and 1984.  On January 18, 1983, he received an Award of Excellence from the provincial government of Ontario.  Bulau was also named Canada's outstanding skier twice.

Horst continues to be involved with amateur sport as Special Advisor to Jozo Weider Alpine Race Team, Blue Mountain.

World Cup

Standings

Wins

References

External links

Canadian Ski Museum Biography and Photos 
Horst Bulau on Facebook

Canadian male ski jumpers
Canadian people of German descent
Skiers from Ottawa
Ski jumpers at the 1980 Winter Olympics
Ski jumpers at the 1984 Winter Olympics
Ski jumpers at the 1988 Winter Olympics
Ski jumpers at the 1992 Winter Olympics
Olympic ski jumpers of Canada
Living people
1962 births